The Pohnpei flycatcher (Myiagra pluto), known  as Koikoi in Pohnpeian, is a species of bird in the family Monarchidae. It is endemic to Micronesia and can be found on the Caroline Islands.

Taxonomy and systematics
Some authorities consider the Pohnpei flycatcher to be a subspecies of the oceanic flycatcher. Alternate names include the Pohnpei broadbill, Ponape broadbill, Ponape flycatcher and Ponape Myiagra flycatcher.

References

External links

 
 
 
 Pohnpei Flycatcher illustration at the College of Micronesia-FSM Digital Library and Archive
 

Fauna of Micronesia
Myiagra
Pohnpei
Endemic fauna of the Federated States of Micronesia
Birds described in 1876
Taxonomy articles created by Polbot